Lameck Onyango Ngoche (born 22 September 1973) is a former Kenyan cricketer. He is a right-handed batsman and a right-arm medium-pace bowler. Though initially not one of cricket's more successful figures, his career began a turnaround during his second year, 1997, in which he switched roles from bowler to a specialist tail-ender for the ICC Trophy.

Career
Since 2004 Onyango has developed into an effective bowling all-rounder and followed up his maiden first-class half century with match winning figures of 6–21 in Kenya's 2005 Intercontinental Trophy victory over Uganada. Lately he has been working on his batting and has made some handy contributions to the Kenyan batting line up.

After five years Onyango was recalled in a surprising fashion - as a number 11 against Australia in 2002, but didn't bowl throughout. Though missing Kenya's World Cup campaign of 2003, he was recalled for 2004 ICC Champions Trophy. In November 2019, he was named in Kenya's squad for the Cricket World Cup Challenge League B tournament in Oman.

In April 2022, Cricket Kenya named Onyango as the interim head coach of the Kenya women's national cricket team.

References

External links
 

1973 births
Living people
Cricketers from Nairobi
Kenyan cricketers
Kenyan Luo people
Kenya One Day International cricketers
Kenya Twenty20 International cricketers
Eastern Aces cricketers
Kenyan cricket coaches